A list of films produced in the Soviet Union in 1956 (see 1956 in film).

1956

See also
1956 in the Soviet Union

External links
 Soviet films of 1956 at the Internet Movie Database

1956
Soviet
Films